The Université Paris-Est Marne-la-Vallée, or commonly known as UPEM, was a French university, in the . The main campus was located at Champs-sur-Marne.  In 2020, UPEM merged with other facilities in the Descartes Campus to become Gustave Eiffel University.

History
UPEM was founded in 1991.  In 2020, UPEM was to  merge with other facilities in the Descartes Campus to become Gustave Eiffel University.

Notable faculty
 Corine Pelluchon (born 1967), philosopher

See also
 Institut Gaspard Monge
 List of public universities in France by academy
 Paris-Est Sup University Group

References

Educational institutions established in 1991
1991 establishments in France
Educational institutions disestablished in 2020
2020 disestablishments in France